Caleb Azariah Paul Southwell (18 July 1913 – 18 May 1979) was the second Premier and first Chief Minister of Saint Kitts and Nevis in the Caribbean. He also worked as a teacher, police officer, and trade unionist.

Early life and career 

Southwell was born in Dominica on 18 July 1913 to Joseph and Amelia Southwell.  At 13 years of age, Southwell became a teacher and later joined the Leeward Islands Police Force in 1938. He served in Antigua, Montserrat, Saint Kitts and Nevis, and Anguilla until he retired from the force in 1944.

In 1944, Southwell became an employee of the Saint Kitts Sugar Factory where he worked as a timekeeper and assistant stock clerk until the end of the sugar factory workers strike in 1948.  Southwell joined the St. Kitts and Nevis Trades and Labour Union and Saint Kitts and Nevis Workers League (now the Saint Kitts and Nevis Labour Party) in 1946 and remained vice president of the Union from 1946 until his death.

Political career 

First elected to the Saint Kitts-Nevis-Anguilla Legislative Council in 1952, Southwell was appointed to the Executive Council in 1955 and served as the First Minister of Communications and Works in 1956. Southwell was appointed as the first Chief Minister of Saint Kitts-Nevis-Anguilla in 1960. He was later appointed Deputy Premier and Minister of Finance, Trade, Development, Industry and Tourism in several Robert Llewellyn Bradshaw administrations from 1967-1978, and assumed the position of full Premier on the death of Bradshaw on 23 May 1978.

Death 

Southwell died of a heart disease on 18 May 1979, less than one year after becoming Premier, in Castries, Saint Lucia. The death occurred during a meeting of the West Indies Associated States Council of Ministers. He was succeeded by his Deputy Premier, Lee Moore.

Legacy 
The Industrial Park in St. Kitts was named in his honor

References 

1913 births
1979 deaths
Prime Ministers of Saint Kitts and Nevis
Deputy Prime Ministers of Saint Kitts and Nevis
Finance ministers of Saint Kitts and Nevis
Saint Kitts and Nevis Labour Party politicians
Recipients of the Order of the National Hero (Saint Kitts and Nevis)
Dominica emigrants to Saint Kitts and Nevis
National Heroes of Saint Kitts and Nevis